Anticheiropus is an ichnogenus of dinosaur footprint belonging to a saurischian. It has only been discovered in Massachusetts (Portland Formation, Newark Supergroup). Two ichnospecies are known (both are known from a single footprint): A. hamatus and A. pilulatus, both discovered around 1863 and named by Edward Hitchcock in 1865.

It had large digits and its tracks were about 20 centimeters long, with no pads from the feet shown on the fossil itself, though the middle digit is the longest on its foot. One of the toes is offset from the rest of the foot, which is where the etymology of Anticheiropus stems from.

See also

 List of dinosaur ichnogenera

References

Reptile trace fossils
Fossil taxa described in 1865